The 1927–28 Indiana Hoosiers men's basketball team represented Indiana University. Their head coach was Everett Dean, who was in his 4th year. For the last time, the team played its home games at the Men's Gymnasium in Bloomington, Indiana, and was a member of the Big Ten Conference.

The Hoosiers finished the regular season with an overall record of 15–2 and a conference record of 10–2, finishing 1st in the Big Ten Conference.

Roster

Schedule/Results

|-
!colspan=8| Regular Season
|-

References

Indiana
Indiana Hoosiers men's basketball seasons
1927 in sports in Indiana
1928 in sports in Indiana